Wheelers Creek flows into the Mohawk River in Rome, New York.

References 

Rivers of New York (state)
Rivers of Oneida County, New York
Mohawk River